Veracruz Reef System National Park is a national marine park and protected area located in Veracruz, Mexico.

Gallery

References 

National parks of Mexico
Ramsar sites in Mexico
Protected areas of Veracruz
Marine parks of Mexico
Important Bird Areas of Mexico